Kastellet may refer to:

Denmark
 Kastellet (Roskilde), a historic house
 Kastellet, Copenhagen, a citadel

Norway
 Kastellet tram stop, an Oslo Tramway station

Sweden
 Kastellet, Stockholm, a citadel
 Kastellet ferry, a passenger ferry in Stockholm
 Kastellet, a citadel at the Karlskrona naval base UNESCO World Heritage Site